is a Japanese judoka, Olympic medalist and world champion. His older brother, Yoshio Nakamura and younger brother, Kenzo Nakamura are also former world champions.

He is from Fukuoka, Fukuoka. After graduation from Tokai University, He belonged to Asahi Kasei.
He received a silver medal in the half lightweight (65 kg) division at the 1996 Summer Olympics in Atlanta. He is world champion from 1993, and received a silver medal at the 1995 World Judo Championships.

As of 2008, He coaches judo at Asahi Kasei with his brothers. Among their pupil are world champion Hiroshi Izumi, Masato Uchishiba and so on.

References

External links
 

1972 births
Living people
Tokai University alumni
Japanese male judoka
Olympic judoka of Japan
Judoka at the 1996 Summer Olympics
Judoka at the 2000 Summer Olympics
Olympic silver medalists for Japan
Olympic medalists in judo
Asian Games medalists in judo
Judoka at the 1994 Asian Games
Judoka at the 1998 Asian Games
Medalists at the 1996 Summer Olympics
Asian Games gold medalists for Japan
Sportspeople from Fukuoka (city)
Medalists at the 1994 Asian Games
Medalists at the 1998 Asian Games
20th-century Japanese people
21st-century Japanese people